Paganese Calcio 1926 is an Italian association football club from Pagani, Campania. It currently plays in Serie C.

History
The club was founded in 1926.

Paganese also took part in the Anglo-Italian Cup in 1978, achieving a single victory and three defeats.

The club won Serie D/H in 2005–2006 and have thus won promotion to Serie C2 for the 2006–2007 season. A second consecutive promotion in the Serie C2 competition of 2006–07, after defeating SPAL and Reggiana in the playoffs, gave Paganese the right to play in Serie C1 in the 2007–08 season, their first appearance in the division since 1979.

At the end of the 2010–11 Lega Pro Prima Divisione season the club was relegated to Lega Pro Seconda Divisione.

In the 2011–12 of Lega Pro Seconda Divisione season, the club was immediately promoted to Lega Pro Prima Divisione, beating Chieti 2–0 in the first round of final play-off followed by 0–0 in the return.

Current squad

Out on loan

Former players

  Vincent Taua

External links
 Official website

Football clubs in Italy
Football clubs in Campania
Association football clubs established in 1926
Serie C clubs
1926 establishments in Italy